Bladensfield was a historic home located near Warsaw, Richmond County, Virginia. It was built about 1790, and was a -story, five-bay, Federal style frame dwelling with a hipped roof and interior end chimneys. The interior featured Federal and Greek Revival details. In 1854, the Bladensfield Seminary was established and the house was enlarged by the addition of a two-bay school room.  It was destroyed by fire in November 1996.

It was added to the National Register of Historic Places in 1980, and delisted in 2001.

References

Former National Register of Historic Places in Virginia
Houses on the National Register of Historic Places in Virginia
Houses completed in 1790
Federal architecture in Virginia
Greek Revival houses in Virginia
Houses in Richmond County, Virginia
National Register of Historic Places in Richmond County, Virginia